The canton of Bonnétable is an administrative division of the Sarthe department, northwestern France. Its borders were modified at the French canton reorganisation which came into effect in March 2015. Its seat is in Bonnétable.

It consists of the following communes:
 
Ballon-Saint-Mars
La Bazoge
Beaufay
Bonnétable
Briosne-lès-Sables
Courcebœufs
Courcemont
Courcival
La Guierche
Jauzé
Joué-l'Abbé
Montbizot
Neuville-sur-Sarthe
Nogent-le-Bernard
Rouperroux-le-Coquet
Sainte-Jamme-sur-Sarthe
Saint-Georges-du-Rosay
Saint-Jean-d'Assé
Saint-Pavace
Souillé
Souligné-sous-Ballon
Teillé
Terrehault

References

Cantons of Sarthe